

Bodo Spranz (1 January 1920  – 1 September 2007) was a German researcher of preclassic meso-American history and director of the ethnological museum in Freiburg. During World War II he was a hauptmann in the Wehrmacht of Nazi Germany receiving the Knight's Cross of the Iron Cross with Oak Leaves. 

From 1947 to 1950 Spranz attended the Art Academy in Bremen and in 1951 was hired as a technical assistant at the Übersee-Museum Bremen (Ethnological Museum in Bremen). With the approval of the Bremen Senate he could study ethnology, folklore and history at the University of Hamburg, without neglecting his museum duties. Professor Franz Termer supervised him in pre-Columbian America and presented him a dissertation topic in this direction. In 1958 he received his doctorate in Hamburg with the thesis "The Codex Borgia; studies the iconography of a Mexican picture manuscript in the Vatican Library in Rome." After graduation, he remained at the Bremen Ethnological Museum. On 1 June 1962 he became the full-time director of the ethnological museum in Freiburg. He qualified in 1969 with a publication "The Pyramids of Totimehuacan/Puebla (Mexico) and their integration into the development of the Preclassic pyramid building in Mesoamerica" and received the Habilitation Ethnology. He held the position of director until 1984.

World War II awards
 Iron Cross (1939) 2nd Class (23 June 1940) 1st Class  (2 July 1941)
 General Assault Badge (6 February 1941)
 4 Tank Destruction Badges for Individual Combatants (27 August 1942)
 German Cross in Gold on 6 May 1943 as Leutnant in the 2./Sturmgeschütz-Abteilung 185
 Knight's Cross of the Iron Cross with Oak Leaves
 Knight's Cross on 3 October 1943 as Oberleutnant and chief of the 1./Sturmgeschütz-Abteilung 237
 308th Oak Leaves on 3 October 1943 as Oberleutnant and chief of the 1./Sturmgeschütz-Abteilung 237

References

Citations

Bibliography

External links
 

1920 births
2007 deaths
Recipients of the Gold German Cross
Recipients of the Knight's Cross of the Iron Cross with Oak Leaves
German prisoners of war in World War II held by the United States
People from Nordhausen, Thuringia
University of Hamburg alumni
German ethnologists
Military personnel from Thuringia
German Army officers of World War II